The 2015–16 Kosovar Cup was the football knockout competition of Kosovo in the 2015–16 season.

First round
These matches were played on 13, 14 and 21 October 2015.

|-

|}

1/8 Final
These matches were played on 19, 20 and 21 February 2016.

|-

|}

Quarterfinals
This matches will be played on 16 and 17 March 2016. Prishtina got a bye to the semi-finals.

Semifinals
This matches will be played on 27 April and 18 May 2016.

First leg

Second leg

Final

References

Cup
Kosovar Cup seasons
Kosovar